Scarborough Football Club started competing in English football from 1887, when the club first competed in the FA Cup, to 2007, when it was liquidated. This list details the club's achievements in all major competitions, and the top scorers for each season.

The club was formed in 1879 and during the early 1880s the club participated in the Scarborough & East Riding County Cup, but took no part in any league. They went on to compete in the Cleveland Amateur League but left after one season, gaining admission to play in the Northern League Second Division for the 1898–99 season. They played in the Yorkshire Combination from 1910 to 1914, but were made to return to the Northern League after the league collapsed. After turning professional, the club competed in the Yorkshire League but after one season there they joined the Midland League, which fielded stronger teams.

Scarborough competed in the Midland League for 26 seasons, which were disrupted by a seven-year absence from 1939 to 1946 due to the Second World War. In 1960 they joined the Northern Counties League. After two seasons, they joined the re-formed North Eastern League for the 1962–63 season, which Scarborough finished as champions. Following this season, Scarborough rejoined the Midland League for five seasons before becoming founder members of the Northern Premier League. The 1972–73 season saw Scarborough finish as runners-up in the league and as winners of the FA Trophy, a competition which the club won on a further two occasions, in 1976 and 1977.

The club became founder members of the Alliance Premier League in 1979, and were the division's champions for the 1986–87 season, when it was renamed the Football Conference. This ensured the club's entry to the Football League Fourth Division as the first non-league team to gain automatic promotion to The Football League. In their second season in the Fourth Division Scarborough reached the play-offs, where they were beaten by Leyton Orient 2–1 on aggregate. The play-offs were again reached in 1998, but a 7–2 aggregate defeat by Torquay United meant elimination in the semi-final. The following season the club finished bottom of the Football League, and endured relegation to the Conference. They played there until falling to the Conference North for the 2006–07 season. This was Scarborough's final season, as they folded in June 2007.

Key

Division shown in bold when it changes due to promotion, relegation or league reorganisation. Top scorer shown in bold when he set or equalled a club record.

P = Played
W = Games won
D = Games drawn
L = Games lost
F = Goals for
A = Goals against
Pts = Points
Pos = Final position

All Prem = Alliance Premier League
Conf = Football Conference
Conf Nat = Conference National
Conf Nor = Conference North
Div 3 = Football League Third Division
Div 4 = Football League Fourth Division
Mid = Midland Football League
NCL = Northern Counties League
NE = North Eastern League
North = Northern League
North 2 = Northern League Division Two
NPL = Northern Premier League
Yorks Comb = Yorkshire Combination
Yorks Lge = Yorkshire League

PR = Preliminary round
QR1 = Qualifying round 1
QR2 = Qualifying round 2
QR3 = Qualifying round 3
QR4 = Qualifying round 4
R1 = Round 1
R2 = Round 2
R3 = Round 3
R4 = Round 4
QF = Quarter-finals 
N = Northern sector
Grp = Group stage

Seasons

Notes

References

 

Scarborough
Seasons